Raúl Sánchez is a Spanish-born Australian rock musician, best known as the lead guitarist in Magic Dirt. Raul initially played in Melbourne based band Muffcake before joining Magic Dirt. Raul currently plays in River Of Snakes, and Tex Perkins super group "The Ape".

Early life 
Raúl Sánchez i Jorge was born on 21 March 1973 in Valencia, Spain.

Magic Dirt 

Sánchez joined Magic Dirt in 1997.

Discography

Magic Dirt

Trivia
 Raúl is vegetarian

References

1973 births
Living people
Spanish expatriates in Australia
Australian songwriters
Australian people of Spanish descent